Mohamed Moualek (born 1 April 1957) is an Algerian wrestler. He competed in the men's Greco-Roman 68 kg at the 1980 Summer Olympics.

References

External links
 

1957 births
Living people
Algerian male sport wrestlers
Olympic wrestlers of Algeria
Wrestlers at the 1980 Summer Olympics
Place of birth missing (living people)
20th-century Algerian people